Ungarie  is a town in New South Wales, Australia which is the second major town of the Bland Shire, located in the Central West region of New South Wales. The town's name is derived from an Indigenous Australian word meaning "thigh".

History 
John Oxley, explorer and NSW surveyor general, was probably the first European to cross through what is now the Ungarie district. This was part of his investigation of the Lachlan Valley area in May 1817. In describing the country he had penetrated he said:

"For the want of timber, grass and water, this country will never be inhabited by civilised man."

He was of course proven wrong and the land west of Bathurst soon opened up. It was about 1852 that John Regan explored the back country of what is now West Wyalong in search of more station country. The Regans had a property east of West Wyalong called The Bland. Soon after he continued to explore further west and came upon the creek that he called The Humbug.

His group was so impressed by the land that it was taken up. A Mr Ward entered into partnership with one of Regan's friend, a Mr Wood. After Regan's explorations more men came to take up various stations.

Wollongough was taken up by Carlo Marino around 1871, followed by the King Family in 1878 and later by John Bros. In 1866 Roger Freeling took up Ungarie Station.

It was around about 1871 that the farming residents in the vicinity of the Humbug took up a petition for a Post Office to be established at Wollongough as they argued that the nearest post office at Marsden was too far away, . The postmaster at Forbes reported that about 20 to 30 residents would benefit from a post office.

Mr George Tout was appointed postmaster on 1 January 1872 with an allowance of ten pounds per annum. The post office closed in 1875 because of some disagreements regarding the cost of the tender for the mail service. There often appeared to be some concern expressed by postmaster Tout regarding the conditions and the viability of the Post office. Once the post office was established a small settlement began to grow.

Mr Tout had erected, at his own cost, an apartment adjoining the post office. It is believed that this was the first building in Ungarie and it was believed to have been located at the rear of Navin's store on the creek.

The old hotel was owned by Mrs Kerwin, and a portion of it, which still stands at the rear of the butcher's shop was the dining room and was built around 1883 by Mr Tout. In 1889 the hotel was sold to the Mackrell family who came here from Wardry, where they conducted a hotel business.

By 1892 the settlement comprised a post office, a hotel, two general stores, a blacksmith shop, a butchery and a boarding house. It was Mr Mackrell who apparently led a group for the establishment of a school in 1891. Even at this stage the Ungarie settlement did not have the distinction of being gazetted as a village and it was in November 1891 that application was made for Ungarie to be established as a village. Following this, Surveyor A. Maitland reported that a village should be surveyed on the south side of the Euglo or Humbug creek in a position which would now be midway between the present township and the original business place adjacent to the east.

Nothing had yet been finalised, so a petition was submitted to the Minister of Lands, urging a survey for a village. Surveyor Roberts reported in December 1892 that a more suitable site existed on the north side of Euglo or Humbug creek opposite the present day township. This was gazetted as the village of Ungarie on 31 March 1894.

The first police residence appeared from Yarrandale in 1896, however it is not exactly clear when the first police constable took up duties. The current police house was built in 1995.

By 1900 the village of Ungarie began to grow and a baker shop was added to the list of services provided in the town.

Railway
After considerable agitation from residents a new branch railway line was approved for construction from the existing terminus of West Wyalong to Ungarie and on to Lake Cargelligo. Construction commenced in 1913 with the line opening on 13 November 1917. The new railway station was located approximately one half mile from the original village, a new village eventually grew around the new station. Nine years later work started on a new branch line from Ungarie to Naradhan to service more wheat collection sidings, this line opened on 11 February 1929.

Present
The current village of Ungarie includes a central school, an Australian rules football/cricket ground, a post office, a pub, a butchery, a fuel station, a mechanic, an AGnVET, a swimming pool, a retirement home and a Catholic church.

Places of interest 

 The BIG FOOTY (Celebrating the contribution of the Danihers to AFL)
 White Elephant Water Tower
 Ungarie War Memorial Hall
 Ungarie Lawn Bowling Club
 Central Hotel

Sport 
The most popular sport in Ungarie is Australian rules football, as it lies in the narrow 'canola belt', a geographical triangle stretching from Grong Grong and Marrar, New South Wales at either end of the Canola Way, to the town itself, in which Australian football retains a strong following, despite New South Wales being a largely rugby league supporting state. This is due in part to the legacy of the Daniher Family.

 Ungarie Magpies - Australian rules football & netball
 Ungarie Cricket Club - Cricket
 Ungarie Tennis Club - Tennis
 Ungarie Bowling Club - Lawn Bowls
 Ungarie Swimming Club - Swimming

Notable people from the area 

 Anthony Daniher, former Australian rules footballer
 Chris Daniher, former Australian rules footballer
 Neale Daniher, former Australian rules footballer and coach
 Terry Daniher, former Australian rules footballer
 Raymond Boultwood Ewers, war sculptor
 Ben Fixter, former Australian rules footballer
 Paul Smith, actor

Gallery

Surrounding towns 
 Tullibigeal (39 km)
 Burcher (46 km) 
 Lake Cargelligo (75 km)
 Weethalle (57 km)
 West Wyalong (44 km)

References

 Astride the Humbug, 1872-1972 – Ungarie, 100 years of town building, published 1973

External links

 Bland Shire Council
 Central Hotel 
 Town and Country Tavern 
 Ungarie Railway Siding and Junction

Towns in New South Wales
Towns in the Central West (New South Wales)
1872 establishments in Australia
Populated places established in 1872